King of Cars is an American reality television series that aired in over 21 countries, centering on the Towbin Dodge car dealership, in Henderson, Nevada, south of Las Vegas, Nevada. Managed by Josh Towbin a.k.a. "Chop" a.k.a. the King of Cars, famous for the cult hit infomercial, "The Chopper Show", in which his salesmen dress up as various characters, as he "chops" the prices of his cars.

Recorded on video in HDTV Widescreen Letterbox Format.

Characters
Many of the salesman are referred to by their nicknames from the informercial.

Josh "Chop" Towbin 
"Chop" is the Owner of thirteen different businesses. He is best known as the Owner of the Towbin Auto Group which consists of Towbin Dodge Ram, Towbin Kia and Towbin Alfa Romeo/Fiat. He was the star and Executive Producer of the show King Of Cars. Throughout the show he leads a team of managers and salespeople.

Towbin Dodge has been the #1 Dodge Dealer in the World for multiple years. Towbin Alfa Romeo Fiat has been the #1 Alfa Romeo and Fiat dealer in the West Business Center for many years. Towbin Kia is the #1 Kia Dealer in the state and is a multi year winner of the Kia President's Award.

Among some of his other businesses, he is piloting a mobility company with Kia named Drive Sally. It consists of a fleet of Kia vehicles, from Towbin Kia, that are available to lease for a short term or long term basis. He is the owner of Towbin Jewelry which is a wholesaler of entry level, high end jewelry, and custom pendants by Richard Beal, Rolex and more. Another venture is Chop is now the President of ISA Boxing and is the sports agent and talent manager representing Muhammad Ali's Grandsons Nico Ali Walsh and Biaggio Ali Walsh. 

Chop is a National Dealer Council Member for all the brands he sells. Dodge, Ram, Alfa Romeo, Fiat and Kia. An accomplishment few in the automotive industry have held.

Chop has sold over 150 cars to Floyd Mayweather and has partnerships and does business with over 200 celebrities. Even if a guest is not a celebrity, Chop has a VIP concierge service to help customers find, and buy, any vehicle they are looking for. This concierge service serves high net worth individuals seeking such vehicles as Maybach's, Buggatti's or whatever the guest requires. 

In his earlier years Chop has been a Radio host on Hot 97.5 and Saturday Night Street Jam DJ.

Chop founded Chopper's Street Fuego and has appeared on many TV shows.

Chop is a major social media influencer and can be found on Instagram at @chop

Mark Deeter a.k.a. Deeter
Started off as a salesman then was promoted to Sales Team Leader and was just recently promoted to the Sales Tower.  Deeter loves his hair and wrestled Man-Hole in baby oil.

Auto Marshall
The Auto Marshall dresses in Western attire - boots, spurs, tight-pants, and a hat.  His real name is Bobby Hood.  He sold cars in Amarillo Texas and previously worked for Papa John's Pizza.

Episodes

Season one 
 Lost pilot (actually from A&E series "Take This Job")
 "We Dooz It Large"
 "Showgirl Showdown"
 "Blue Day"
 "Fresh Meat"
 "King for a Day"
 "Leader of the Pack"
 "Talkin' Turkey"
 "Low Rider"
 "Dunkarini"
 "Closing the Deal"
 "Performance Anxiety"
 "Keeping Up with the Joneses"

Season two
Season two premiered on January 31, 2007, bringing the total number of episodes to 28 + the lost pilot

 "The Contenders"
 "Women Drivers"
 "Green Peas"
 "Fired Up!"
 "Oil Crisis!"
 "Magic Blue Room"
 "Ugly Truckling"
 "Sunny Day"
 "Hoop Dreamz"
 "The Chopping Block"
 "The O-Zone"
 "Even Cowboys Get the Blues"
 "Hoppy Birthday"
 "Calendar Guys"
 "Who Wears the Pants?"
 "Hair to the Throne"

Home media
King of Cars Season 1 is on DVD at the A&E Store, there are no plans for a season 2 DVD release at this time.

Appearances on other TV Shows
Josh "Chop" Towbin appeared in Pawn Stars Season 8 episode 6 "Comfortably Chum" where he bought a 1924 Dodge Brothers business sedan for $7,900. The sedan was acquired in Season 5 episode 11 "Corey's Big Play". He also has appeared on Jimmy Kimmel, The Tonight Show, five time guest on Dr. Phil as the Car Expert giving multiple cars away to those in need and mentoring women on the buying process. Chop also was on the season premier for Faking It and Street Customs on the TLC Network and Take This Job on A&E.

References

 King of Cars Official Website

2000s American reality television series
2006 American television series debuts
2007 American television series endings
A&E (TV network) original programming
English-language television shows
Television shows set in Las Vegas